Antoine-Martial Louis Barizain also called Louis Monrose or Monrose (1811–1883) was a 19th-century French actor. The actor Claude Louis Séraphin Barizain (1783-1843) was his father. The actress Mademoiselle Monrose was his step sister due to her marriage with his brother, Eugène (Barizain).

He was appointed a professor at the Conservatory in 1867. He was Lucien Guitry's first drama teacher and also taught the comedian Lucie Manvel.

Theatre

Career at the Comédie-Française 
 Admission in 1833
 Appointed 275th sociétaire in 1852
 Leave in 1869

External links 
 Base documentaire La Grange on the site of the Comédie-Française

Sociétaires of the Comédie-Française
19th-century French male actors
French male stage actors
Drama teachers
1811 births
1883 deaths